The Devil Wears Prada, an American metalcore band from Dayton, Ohio, have released eight studio albums, one demo, three extended plays, twenty-six singles and twenty-eight music videos.

Albums

Studio albums

Live albums

Compilations
 Punk Goes Crunk – "Still Fly" (Big Tymers cover; 2008)
 Warped Tour 2008 – "Reptar, King of the Ozone" (2008)
 Warped Tour 2009 – "Sassafras" (2009)
 Warped Tour 2011 – "Anatomy" (2011)
 Warped Tour 2014 – "Sailor's Prayer" (2014)

Demos
Patterns of a Horizon (The Foundation Recording Studios, 2005)

EPs

Singles

Music videos

Notes

References

Discographies of American artists
Heavy metal group discographies